Ben Watson (born 20 March 1990) is a British weightlifter from Oxfordshire. He competed for England in the men's 105 kg event at the 2014 Commonwealth Games where he won a bronze medal.

Major results

References

External links

1990 births
Living people
English male weightlifters
Commonwealth Games bronze medallists for England
Weightlifters at the 2014 Commonwealth Games
Commonwealth Games medallists in weightlifting
Medallists at the 2014 Commonwealth Games